TCCU may refer to:
 transitional cell carcinoma of urothelial tract
 Teachers College, Columbia University 
 Thuringian Customs and Commerce Union